Tanha is an Indian television drama which aired on Star Plus in 1999.It was a joint presentation of India and Pakistan and it included top Pakistani actors such as Sajid Hasan and
Marina Khan. The lyrics for the title song were composed by Javed Akhtar and set to tune by Raju Singh. It was written by Haseena Moin, the writer of popular Pakistani television series like Dhoop Kinare, Tanhaiyaan and Ankahi. Tanha was a very popular drama and it received huge ratings. It was an Indo-Pak Drama and was enjoyed by the people of South Asia.

Synopsis
Tanha is a poignant family drama. Sushma Seth plays the role of a contemporary Muslim woman, Shakeela Begum, a widow running a prosperous garment export industry. She is dynamic and an inspiration, who strives to keep her family together.

The series opens with the family getting together to celebrate Eid. The story then unfolds the interesting and colourful characters and the intimacy and filial love between them. The series has been shot on location in Lucknow, Aligarh and other important cities in India.

Plot
A poignant family drama, Tanha is based on a widow (Sushma Seth), who strives to keep her family together. After facing a bunch of problems and difficulties in the end she succeeds to keep her whole family together.

Cast
 Sushma Seth      - Shakeela Begum
 Aasif Sheikh - Ali Rehman
 Anang Desai
 Atul Agnihotri   - Arif(Shakeela Begum's eldest son)
 Sarvat Sanjar
 Sajid Hasan
 Marina Khan      - Ramsha(Shakeela Begum's niece)
 Minha Zameer
 Parikshit Sahni
 Iravati Harshe   - Ruksaana (Shakeela Begum's elder daughter)
 Vivek Mushran    - Nadeem (Ruksaana's husband)
 Tanaaz Currim    - Shanzi(Arif's love interest)
 Kruttika Desai Khan
 Sandali Sinha
 Sudhir Pandey
 Sulabha Deshpande
 Varsha Usgaonkar
 Vijayendra Ghatge
 Firdaus Dadi
 Nishigandha Wad
 Miral
 Milind Soman   - Aamir (Shakeela Begum's son)
 Aamir Parack   - Aamir (Shakeela Begum's son) Childhood Role

References

External links
 http://www.starindiacontent.com/shows.asp?programid=138 

Indian drama television series
StarPlus original programming
1997 Indian television series debuts
1999 Indian television series endings
Pakistani drama television series